Kim Jang-saeng (김장생, 金長生) (July 8, 1548 - August 3, 1631) was a Neo-Confucian scholar, politician, educator, and writer of Korea's Joseon period.

He was successor to the Neo-Confucian academic tradition of Yulgok Yi I (이이) and Seong Hon (성혼).

Family  
 Great-Grandfather
 Kim Jong-yun (김종윤, 金宗胤)
 Grandfather
 Kim Ho (김호, 金鎬)
 Grandmother
 Lady Lee of the Jeonui Lee clan (전의 이씨)
 Father
 Kim Gye-hwi (김계휘, 金繼輝) (1526 - 1582)
 Uncle - Kim Eun-hwi (김은휘, 金殷輝)
 Cousin - Lady Kim of the Gwangsan Kim clan (본관: 광산 김씨, 光山 金氏) (? - 1621)
 Cousin-in-law - Song Jun-gil (송준길, 宋浚吉) (28 December 1606 - 2 December 1672)
 Cousin - Kim Seon-saeng (김선생, 金善生); son of Kim Ip-hui
 Uncle - Kim Ip-hei (김입휘, 金立輝)
 Cousin - Kim Gil-saeng (김길생, 金吉生)
 Cousin - Kim Han-saeng (김한생, 金漢生)
 Cousin - Lady Kim of the Gwangsan Kim clan (광산 김씨, 光山 金氏)
 Cousin - Lady Kim of the Gwangsan Kim clan (광산 김씨, 光山 金氏)
 Cousin - Lady Kim of the Gwangsan Kim clan (광산 김씨, 光山 金氏)
 Uncle - Kim Gong-hwi (김입휘, 金立輝)
 Cousin - Kim Ui-saeng (김의생, 金義生); son of Kim Ip-hui
 Cousin - Kim Si-saeng (김시생, 金始生)
 Cousin - Lady Kim of the Gwangsan Kim clan (광산 김씨, 光山 金氏)
 Mother
 Lady Shin of the Pyeongsan Shin clan (평산 신씨) (1533 - 1618)
 Grandfather - Shin Yeong (신영, 申瑛)
 Siblings
 Younger sister - Lady Kim of the Gwangsan Kim clan (광산 김씨, 光山 金氏)
 Brother-in-law - Jeong Gi-myeong (정기명, 鄭起溟)
 Nephew - Jeong Woon (정운, 鄭沄)
 Niece - Lady Jeong 
 Younger half-brother - Kim Ui-sun (김의손, 金義孫)
 Younger half-brother - Kim Yeon-sun (김연손, 金燕孫)
 Younger half-brother - Kim Gyeong-sun (김경손, 金慶孫)
 Younger half-brother - Kim Pyeong-sun (김평손, 金平孫)
 Younger half-sister - Lady Kim of the Gwangsan Kim clan (광산 김씨, 光山 金氏)
 Brother-in-law - Yun Gyeong-nam (윤경남, 尹敬男)
 Younger half-sister - Lady Kim of the Gwangsan Kim clan (광산 김씨, 光山 金氏); Kim Sang-yong’s second wife
 Brother-in-law - Kim Sang-yong (김상용, 金尙容) (1561 - 22 January 1637)
 Half-Nephew - Kim Gwang-hyeong (김광형, 金光炯)
 Half-Nephew - Kim Gwang-hwan (김광환, 金光煥)
 Half-Nephew - Kim Gwang-hyeon (김광현, 金光炫) (1584 - 1647)
 Half-grandnephew - Kim Su-in (김수인, 金壽仁)
 Half-grandniece - Lady Kim of the Andong Kim clan
 Grandnephew-in-law - Kang Mun-myeong (강문명)
 Half-Niece - Lady Yeongga of the Andong Kim clan (영가부부인 김씨, 永嘉府夫人 金氏) (? - 19 January 1654)
 Nephew-in-law - Jang Yu (장유, 張維) (22 January 1588 - 30 April 1638)
 Grandniece - Queen Inseon of the Deoksu Jang clan (인선왕후 장씨) (9 February 1619 - 19 March 1674)
 Half-Niece - Lady Kim of the Andong Kim clan (신 안동 김씨, 新 安東 金氏)
 Wives and their children 
 Lady Jo of the Changnyeong Jo clan (창녕 조씨, 昌寧 曺氏) (1551 - 1586)
 Son - Kim Eun (김은, 金檃)
 Son - Kim Jib (김집, 金集) (1574 - 1656)
 Daughter-in-law - Lady Yu of the Gigye Yu clan (기계 유씨)
 Daughter-in-law - Lady Yi of the Deoksu Yi clan (덕수 이씨)
 Grandson - Kim Ik-hyeong (김익형, 金益炯)
 Grandson - Kim Ik-ryeon (김익련, 金益煉)
 Son - Kim Ban (김반, 金槃)
 Daughter-in-law - Kim of the Andong Kim clan (안동 김씨)
 Grandson - Kim Ik-ryeol (김익렬, 金益烈)
 Daughter-in-law - Lady Seo of the Yeonsan Seo clan (연산 서씨)
 Grandson - Kim Ik-hui (김익희, 金益熙)
 Grandson - Kim Ik-gyeom (김익겸, 金益兼) (1614 - 22 January 1637)
 Granddaughter-in-law - Lady Yun of the Haepyeong Yun clan (해평 윤씨, 海平 尹氏) (1617 - 1689) 
 Great-grandson - Kim Man-gi (김만기, 金萬基) (1633 - 15 March 1687)
 Great-Great-granddaughter - Queen Ingyeong of the Gwangsan Kim clan (인경왕후 김씨) (25 October 1661 - 16 December 1680)
 Great-grandson - Kim Man-jung (김만중, 金萬重) (6 March 1637 – 14 June 1692)
 Daughter-in-law - Lady Kim (김씨)
 Grandson - Kim Ik-hun (김익훈, 金益勳) (1619 - 11 March 1689)
 Grandson - Kim Ik-gyeong (김익경, 金益炅) (1629 - 1675)
 Grandson - Kim Ik-hu (김익후, 金益煦)
 Lady Kim of the Suncheon Kim clan (순천 김씨, 順天 金氏)
 Unnamed concubine 
 4 unnamed children

See also
 Gwangsan Kim clan
 Kim Jip
 Queen Ingyeong
 Kim Manjung
 Kim Ik-hun
 Song Jun-gil
 Song Si-yeol
 Yun Hyu
 Yun Jeung
Queen Inseon

References

 Daehwan, Noh. "The Eclectic Development of Neo-Confucianism and Statecraft from the 18th to the 19th Century," Korea Journal. Winter 2003.
 Haboush, JaHyun Kim and Martina Deuchler. (1999). Culture and the State in Late Chosŏn Korea.  Cambridge: Harvard University Press. ;  OCLC 40926015
 Lee, Peter H. (1993). Sourcebook of Korean Civilization, Vol.  1. New York: Columbia University Press. ; ; ;  OCLC 26353271

External links 
 김장생, 한국의 문화인물 
 Gim Jangsaeng, Duke of Munwon 
 Gim Jangsaeng

1548 births
1631 deaths
Neo-Confucian scholars
Korean educators
17th-century Korean philosophers
17th-century Korean poets